Hangin' Tough is the second studio album by American boy band New Kids on the Block, released on August 12, 1988, by  Columbia Records. It is widely regarded as the breakthrough album of the group's career, gaining positive reviews for their musical transition from bubblegum pop to urban contemporary, blended with popular rock music. Originally the group's label had already planned to end their contract when their first album in 1986 garnered little commercial and critical attention which nearly led to their breakup. However, Maurice Starr, the group's producer, diligently persuaded the label to let them record for a second album.

Hangin' Tough led the group to success due to the emergence of their music to radio airplay and creation of music videos for each released single, showcasing the group's visual appeal. Their popularity was eventually built as they made TV appearances and embarked on promotional tours. By the end of 1989, the album topped on the US Billboard 200 charts, while it peaked at number two on the Canadian Albums Chart that year and the UK Albums Chart the following year. The album has a home-media video release entitled New Kids on the Block: Hangin' Tough which is a documented musical film about the group's biographical career, released in 1989. It also contains a series of music videos, live performances, and exclusive interviews from the group and their fans. The album and film received accolades: two American Music Awards and at least one Grammy Award nomination.

With sales of more than 15 million copies worldwide, Hangin' Tough became the group's best-selling album and it was certified diamond in Canada by the Canadian Recording Industry Association (CRIA) with sales of more than one million units, while 8× platinum in the U.S. by the Recording Industry Association of America (RIAA), making it the country's second best-selling album of 1989, behind Bobby Brown's Don't Be Cruel. The album spawned five commercial singles: "Please Don't Go Girl", "You Got It (The Right Stuff)", "I'll Be Loving You (Forever)", "Hangin' Tough", and "Cover Girl". All were top-ten hits on the Billboard Hot 100 chart, making them the first teen act to gain such chart success. An album titled "More Hangin' Tough", which included remixed and instrumental versions of the album songs was released in Japan. Following the release of the 30th Anniversary Edition of the album in 2019, which contains remixes of previous singles plus three newly recorded songs, the album re-entered the US Billboard 200 chart at number 18.

Singles
Five singles were released from Hangin' Tough. The lead single "Please Don't Go Girl" was released in April 1988. The song became a major hit on radio stations nationwide and became their first top-ten single in Billboard Hot 100, peaking at number ten. The second single was "You Got It (The Right Stuff)", a worldwide hit which peaked at number three on the Billboard charts. "I'll Be Loving You (Forever)", a ballad, was the third single released and became their first number-one on the Billboard Hot 100. The title track was released next and also reached number one. "Cover Girl" was the fifth released; it peaked at number two.

"My Favorite Girl" was released in January 1990 as a promotional single sent to radio, but was not made commercially available at retail.

Critical reception

The album received positive reviews from music critics. Reviews of Dan Heilman and Bil Carpenter of AllMusic said "Good songs collected by New Kids mastermind Maurice Starr highlight this smash, including 'I'll Be Loving You (Forever)', 'You Got It (The Right Stuff)', 'Please Don't Go Girl', and the title track. Tight, warm, even soulful harmony on the ballads."

Robert Christgau, gave a grade of C+ to the album. He stated that:

Accolades
Hangin' Tough won two American Music Awards in January 1990—the "Favorite Pop/Rock Album" and "Favorite Pop/Rock Band/Duo/Group", beating Paula Abdul's Forever Your Girl and Bobby Brown's Don't Be Cruel in Favorite Pop/Rock Album category, and Bon Jovi and Milli Vanilli in Favorite Pop/Rock Band/Duo/Group category. The Hangin' Tough music film was nominated for a Grammy Award for Best Music Video, Long Form (now called Best Music Film) at the 1990 Grammy Awards, but lost to Rhythm Nation 1814 by Janet Jackson, beating Eurythmics's Savage, Michael Jackson's Moonwalker, and Pink Floyd's In Concert: Delicate Sound of Thunder.

Track listing
All songs were produced by Maurice Starr.

Personnel
Jonathan Knight – lead and backing vocals
Jordan Knight – lead and backing vocals, associate producer
Joey McIntyre – lead and backing vocals
Donnie Wahlberg – lead and backing vocals, associate producer
Danny Wood – lead and backing vocals, programming, associate producer, recording, mixing, engineer
Cecil Holmes – executive producer
Maurice Starr – arranger, producer, recording, mixing, engineer, acoustic guitar, electric guitar, keyboards, synthesizers, synthesized, electric bass, drum programming
Phil Greene – recording, mixing, engineer
Richard Mendelson – recording, mixing, engineer
Hediki Sunada – recording, mixing, engineer

Charts

Weekly charts

Year-end charts

Certifications and sales

References

1988 albums
New Kids on the Block albums
Albums produced by Maurice Starr
Columbia Records albums